The Sarnia Sailors are a defunct Canadian semi-professional and amateur senior ice hockey team.  The team played in the City of Sarnia, Ontario, Canada and participated in the International Hockey League and the OHA Senior A Hockey League afterwards.

History
The Sarnia Sailors began as an expansion team in 1949 with the Chatham Maroons in the International Hockey League. That year, the two upstarts dominated the league's playoffs and ended up in a one-on-one showdown for the Turner Cup.  The Maroons came out on top, winning the series in seven games. From that point on, the Sailors demise began. They played one more season in the IHL before dropping to the amateur ranks in the OHA Senior A Hockey League. The Sailors were finalists for the J. Ross Robertson Cup in the 1950–51 season.

Meeting a similar talent lever in the OHA, the Sailors struggled for three seasons before folding mid-season in 1953–54. The Sailors never stepped back on the ice. The team name was shared by the local Junior "B" hockey team. In 1954, after the Sr. Sailors folded, the team changed their names to the Sarnia Legionnaires. The Legionnaires folded mid-season as well, in 1969–70.

Season-by-season results

References

Defunct ice hockey teams in Canada
Ice hockey teams in Ontario
International Hockey League (1945–2001) teams
Sport in Sarnia
Senior ice hockey teams
1949 establishments in Ontario
Ice hockey clubs established in 1949
1954 disestablishments in Ontario
Ice hockey clubs disestablished in 1954